The Consulate-General of the United Kingdom in Saint Petersburg was part of the diplomatic mission of the United Kingdom in the Russian Federation, before it was shut down. The current British Consul General in Saint Petersburg was Sangeeta Ahuja, she was appointed to the post in February 2017, and arrived there in December of the same year.

History

As the Russian Federation replaced the Soviet Union, the British Consulate-General in St. Petersburg was re-opened, and Barbara Hay was appointed as its first new Consul-General in 1992.

In response to the UK's decision to expel 23 Russian diplomats following the poisoning of Sergei and Yulia Skripal, Russia expelled 23 British diplomats, closed the British Council in Russia and closed the Consulate-General.

Other locations in Russia

Outside of Saint Petersburg, there is also a British Consulate-General in Yekaterinburg, as well as the Embassy of the United Kingdom in Moscow.

See also
List of diplomatic missions in Russia
Embassy of the United Kingdom in Moscow
Russia–United Kingdom relations

References

Diplomatic missions in Saint Petersburg
Russia–United Kingdom relations
Saint_Petersburg
Tsentralny District, Saint Petersburg